Lecithocera terrigena is a moth in the family Lecithoceridae. It was described by Edward Meyrick in 1904. It is found in Australia, where it has been recorded from New South Wales and Tasmania.

The forewings are dark bronzy fuscous and the hindwings are rather dark fuscous.

References

Moths described in 1904
terrigena